Devil's Roundup (Spanish: El cerco del diablo) is a 1952 Spanish drama film directed by Antonio del Amo, Enrique Gómez, Edgar Neville, José Antonio Nieves Conde and Arturo Ruiz Castillo.

Cast
 Fernando Aguirre as Pescador  
 Margarita Andrey as Muchacha  
 Valeriano Andrés as Policía  
 Julio Ballesteros as General  
 Rafael Bardem as Marido  
 José Bódalo as Hombre 
 Antonio Casas 
 Manuel de Juan as Barman  
Manuel Dicenta as Cómplice  
 Julio Ferrer as Griego  
 Juan García del Diestro as Jugador  
 Manrique Gil as Ventero  
 José María Lado as Padre  
 Agustín Laguilhoat as Revisor  
 Concha López Silva as Bruja  
 Guillermo Marín as Diablo 
 Manuel Medina as Atracador  
 Trini Montero as Moza  
 Conchita Montes as Eva  
 Gina Montes as Otra moza  
 José Prada as Inspector  
 Luis Prendes as Buhonero  
 Fernando Rey as Atracador  
 José Riesgo 
 Antonio Riquelme 
 Horacio Socías as Boticario  
 Virgilio Teixeira as Ángel  
 José Telmo as Diplomático  
 Tilda Thamar as Susana  
 Ángel Álvarez as Cajero

References

Bibliography 
 Betz, Mark. Beyond the Subtitle: Remapping European Art Cinema. U of Minnesota Press, 2009.

External links 
 

1952 drama films
Spanish drama films
1952 films
1950s Spanish-language films
Films directed by José Antonio Nieves Conde
Films directed by Enrique Gómez
Films directed by Edgar Neville
Films directed by Antonio del Amo
Films directed by Arturo Ruiz Castillo
Films scored by Jesús García Leoz
Spanish black-and-white films
Works by Camilo José Cela
1950s Spanish films